Nicholas Kroll (born June 5, 1978) is an American actor, voice actor, comedian, writer, and producer. He is known for creating and starring in the Comedy Central series Kroll Show, The Oh, Hello Show, the FX comedy series The League, and starring in and co-creating the animated Netflix series Big Mouth.

He has also acted or voice-acted in films such as Adult Beginners, Sausage Party, Loving, Sing, Captain Underpants: The First Epic Movie, The House, Uncle Drew, Operation Finale, The Secret Life of Pets 2, and The Addams Family.

Early life
Kroll was born in Rye, New York, on June 5, 1978, to Lynn and Jules Kroll. His father is a billionaire businessman who founded the corporate investigations and risk consulting firm Kroll Inc. The youngest child in the family, Kroll has a brother, Jeremy, and two sisters, Vanessa and Dana. He grew up in a Conservative Jewish family, and attended the Solomon Schechter School of Westchester. He went on to high school at Rye Country Day School. During this time, he also briefly attended The Mountain School in Vershire, Vermont, where he developed a fondness for hiking. In 2001, Kroll graduated from Georgetown University. He described himself as a history major who minored in art and Spanish, but found himself "gravitating toward media studies as time went on".

Career

Early in his career, Kroll contributed writing for Comedy Central's Chappelle's Show and MTV's Human Giant. In November and December 2008, he toured with Aziz Ansari on his Glow in the Dark comedy tour in the United States. Kroll's live work is a mix of standup, sketch and characters. In 2011, Comedy Central aired his stand-up special Thank You Very Cool. He has studied and performed regularly at the Upright Citizens Brigade Theater in NYC and LA and co-hosted the stand-up show Welcome to Our Week with Jessi Klein.

He is well known as a performer for his characters such as Bobby Bottleservice, who has been featured in a number of online videos for the Funny or Die website, including the Ed Hardy Boyz and an audition tape for the MTV show Jersey Shore. Other characters include Ref Jeff and Fabrice Fabrice, and Gil Faizon of The Oh, Hello Show, who he created with writing partner John Mulaney. His character work features prominently in Kroll Show, a sketch comedy show on Comedy Central. Kroll was honored with the Breakout Star of the Year award from the 2013 Just For Laughs Comedy Festival in Montreal, Quebec, Canada.

The Oh, Hello Show

Kroll toured the U.S. alongside John Mulaney in a show called Oh, Hello, with both in character as Gil Faizon and George St. Geegland respectively. The show premiered on Broadway on September 23, 2016 and ran for six months to positive reviews. The Broadway performance was filmed and released on Netflix in 2017.

Television

Kroll's first significant career success came when he co-starred in the ABC sitcom Cavemen, based on the Geico-insurance TV-commercial characters. Although the show was cancelled after seven episodes, he called his role “the most important experience of my professional career”. He went on to VH1's Best Week Ever, and to guest-starring roles on Parks and Recreation, Community, Unbreakable Kimmy Schmidt, and New Girl. He made appearances on numerous Comedy Central series such as Reno 911!, John Oliver's New York Stand Up Show, and The Benson Interruption, both performing as himself and in character.

Kroll had a starring role as Rodney Ruxin in the FXX comedy series The League, which aired October 29, 2009 to December 9, 2015. Concurrently, he created and starred in his own Comedy Central sketch series, Kroll Show, which aired January 16, 2013 to March 24, 2015. Kroll had a recurring role on Childrens Hospital on Adult Swim. His voice work includes the character Stu on the HBO animated series The Life & Times of Tim, as well as Andrew LeGustambos, the flamboyant, bisexual drama teacher in the animated Fox comedy series Sit Down, Shut Up. voiced to sound like a "modern day Snagglepuss", and as Reuben Grinder in the PBS Kids GO! series WordGirl. Kroll was one of the roasters on the Comedy Central Roast of James Franco.

In 2017, Kroll co-created, wrote, and starred in Big Mouth, an animated television show on Netflix. The show features the experiences of a group of 7th graders in the throes of puberty. Two of the main characters are based on, and named after, Kroll and his best friend from childhood, Andrew Goldberg. Kroll plays Nick, as well as Coach Steve, Maurice the Hormone Monster, Lola, Rick the Hormone Monster, the Jansen twins and Lady Liberty, in addition to several further minor and one-off characters. The second season premiered on October 5, 2018.

Film

Kroll starred in A Good Old Fashioned Orgy and had supporting roles in comedy films such as Sing, Dinner For Schmucks, Date Night, Get Him to the Greek, Adventures of Power, and I Love You Man.

In 2016, Kroll's first villain role was a vaginal douche in the adult animated film Sausage Party. Originally, he played Douche's voice in a British accent, but the team wanted to make a Pixar-like film instead of a Disney Renaissance-like film.

In 2017, Kroll then had a second villain voice role as a villainous mad scientist Professor Poopypants in the DreamWorks animated superhero film Captain Underpants: The First Epic Movie. Although many critics only either mentioned his character in passing, some pointing out his similarities with Albert Einstein, or his "committed" performance, Matt Zoller Seitz took particular note of his performance, praising it as "irrepressibly silly" with "an orange juice spit-take voice". Seitz further stated that "[t]he way Kroll savors every syllable of his alternately peevish, self-pitying and nonsensical dialogue—aided mightily by the animators, who've given the character a fireplug body and a waddling walk—transforms the ridiculous into the sublime." In recent years, Kroll has taken several non-comedic acting roles, such as that of Bernie Cohen in Loving and Rafi Eitan in Operation Finale, both historical drama films.

Book
In 2005, Kroll published a book, Bar Mitzvah Disco, cowritten with Jules Shell and Roger Bennett.

Personal life
In May 2013, Kroll began dating comedian and actress Amy Poehler. They ended their relationship in 2015.

Kroll met landscape artist Lily Kwong in 2018. They married in November 2020 and their son was born in January 2021.

Kroll's brother-in-law is journalist Roger Bennett. Through his wife, his cousin-in-law is fashion designer Joseph Altuzarra.

Filmography

Accolades

References

External links

Nick Kroll on Funny or Die

1978 births
Living people
American male comedians
American male film actors
American male television actors
American sketch comedians
American stand-up comedians
American television writers
American male television writers
American male voice actors
Jewish American male actors
Jewish American male comedians
Georgetown University alumni
Male actors from New York (state)
People from Rye, New York
Rye Country Day School alumni
Comedians from New York (state)
Jewish American comedians
Upright Citizens Brigade Theater performers
21st-century American comedians
Screenwriters from New York (state)
21st-century American screenwriters
21st-century American male writers
21st-century American Jews